Osuna is a town and municipality in the province of Seville, Spain.

Osuna may also refer to:

People
Al Osuna (born 1965), Mexican baseball player
Antonio Osuna (born 1973), Mexican baseball player
Blanca Osuna (born 1950), Argentine politician
Francisco de Osuna (1492/97–1540), Spanish Franciscan friar and writer
Gloria Osuna Perez (1947–1999), Chicana artist
Héctor Osuna Jaime (born 1957), Mexican architect and politician
Jess Osuna (1928–2011), American character actor
José Carlos Cota Osuna (born 1946), Mexican politician
José Guadalupe Osuna Millán (born 1955), Mexican economist and politician, Governor of Baja California
José Osuna (born 1992), Venezuelan baseball player
Juan María Osuna (1785–1851), early settler of San Diego, California
Mario Osuna (born 1988), Mexican football player
Rafael Osuna (1938–1969), Mexican tennis player
Roberto Osuna (born 1995), Mexican baseball player
Sercan Sararer Osuna

Other uses
Bull of Osuna, Iberian sculpture from the end of the 5th century BCE
Codex Osuna, Aztec codex from 1565
Duke of Osuna, Spanish noble title
University of Osuna (1548–1824), institution and building in Seville, Spain

See also
Ozuna

Disambiguation pages with surname-holder lists
Spanish-language surnames